Senati FBC is a Peruvian football club, playing in the city of Arequipa, Peru.

History
Senati FBC is of the clubs with greater tradition in the city of Arequipa, Peru.

In 2004 Copa Perú, the club classified to National Stage but was eliminated by Deportivo Municipal of Lima in the semifinals.

In 2005 Copa Perú, the club classified to National Stage but was eliminated by José Gálvez of Chimbote in the final.

In 2006 Copa Perú, the club classified to National Stage but was eliminated by Total Clean of Arequipa in the quarterfinals.

Honours

National
Copa Perú: 0
Runner-up (1): 2005

Regional
Región VII: 1
Winners (1):  2005
Runner-up (2): 2004, 2006

Región VIII: 0
Runner-up (1): 1998

Liga Departamental de Arequipa: 3
Winners (3): 1998, 2004, 2005
Runner-up (1): 2006

See also
List of football clubs in Peru
Peruvian football league system

References

External links
 Peru - List of Departamental Champions (Amateur Leagues)
 Senati FBC y Juventus ya tienen todo definido en la Regional

Football clubs in Peru